The Zoopagaceae are a family of fungi in the Zoopagales order. The family contain contains 6 genera, and 78 species. The family was circumscribed in 1938.

References

External links

Zygomycota